Daniel Godfrey may refer to:

 Daniel Godfrey (bandmaster) (1831–1903), bandmaster, composer and arranger of compositions for military bands
 Dan Godfrey (1868–1939), his son, British music conductor
 Daniel Strong Godfrey (born 1949), American composer